Debris is an American science fiction television series that premiered on March 1, 2021 on NBC. The series, produced by Universal Television and Legendary Television, was created and co-executive produced by J. H. Wyman. In May 2021, the series was canceled after one season.

Premise
Debris of an alien spacecraft has been falling across Earth over the last six months. An international task force is formed to identify and collect these pieces because they are found to have unusual and often deadly effects on humans and their surroundings. The show follows partners CIA operative Bryan Beneventi and MI6 operative Finola Jones as they track down these pieces. But there are also others who are seeking the pieces for themselves.

Cast and characters

Main

 Jonathan Tucker as Bryan Beneventi, a CIA operative
 Riann Steele as Finola Jones, a MI6 operative
 Norbert Leo Butz as Craig Maddox, a CIA operative and Beneventi's handler
 Scroobius Pip as Anson Ash, a member of Influx, an extremist group that seeks to use the debris for unknown purposes.

Recurring
 Anjali Jay as Priya Ferris, Jones' MI6 handler
 Gabrielle Ryan as Dee Dee, Jones' younger sister
 Sebastian Roché as Brill, another MI6 agent. Roché also plays an unidentified individual who has stolen Brill's identity.
 Thomas Cadrot as Tom, an Orbital teammember
 Andrea Stefancikova as Irina, a Russian secret agent
 Tyrone Benskin as George Jones, a scientist who is Finola's and Dee Dee's father
 Armin Karame as Brandt, an Orbital technician
 Jennifer Copping as Julia Maddox, Craig's wife
 Christian Rose as Dario Maddox, Craig and Julia Maddox’s son
 Ben Cotton as Loeb, a member of Influx

Episodes

Production

Development
The series was ordered as a pilot by NBC in January 2020, the first drama to be given a pilot order by the network for the 2020–21 season. The same day it was also announced that Jason Hoffs would be joining J.H. Wyman as co-executive producer. On June 29, 2020, NBC picked up the pilot to series. On May 27, 2021, NBC canceled the series after one season.

Casting
On February 11, 2020, it was announced that Jonathan Tucker had been cast in the pilot as the male lead, in the character of Bryan Beneventi. Shortly after, it was announced that Riann Steele had been cast to portray the character of Finola Jones, the female lead. The same month, it was announced that Norbert Leo Butz would be joining the series main cast as Craig Maddox. On October 20, 2020, Anjali Jay was cast in a recurring role. On December 18, 2020, Gabrielle Ryan joined the cast in a recurring capacity. On January 26, 2021, Scroobius Pip was listed as being a main cast member. On February 3, 2021, Sebastian Roché was cast in a recurring role.

Filming
Though the series was greenlighted only in January 2020, the majority of the pilot was filmed before production was suspended across the United States due to the COVID-19 pandemic. Filming for the remainder of the first season took place from November 2, 2020 to April 9, 2021, in Vancouver, British Columbia.

Broadcast
The series premiered on March 1, 2021, on NBC. Legendary Television secured a deal with TF1 and U-Next for exclusive distribution rights to the series in France and Japan.

Reception

Critical response
On Rotten Tomatoes, the series holds an approval rating of 72% based on 18 critic reviews, with an average rating of 6.75/10. The website's critical consensus reads, "Though Debris early characterization is a shade too ambiguous, its central mystery has enough spooky sci-fi juice to keep viewers guessing—for at least one season." On Metacritic, it has a weighted average score of 63 out of 100 based on 11 critic reviews, indicating "generally favorable reviews".

Saloni Gajjar of The A.V. Club gave the series a B- and wrote a review saying, "As much as they're trying, the actors don't yet have the prowess to carry the emotive weight of the show. To find its space in this television landscape, Debris should rely on the power of the titular space junk."

Ratings

References

External links
 
  

2020s American drama television series
2020s American mystery television series
2020s American science fiction television series
2020s American supernatural television series
2021 American television series debuts
2021 American television series endings
English-language television shows
NBC original programming
Television productions suspended due to the COVID-19 pandemic
Television series about the Central Intelligence Agency
Television series by Universal Television
Television series by Legendary Television
Television shows filmed in Vancouver